Bettborn is a commune in the Moselle department in Grand Est in northeastern France.

Toponymy 
Former names: Bedebur in 1316, Betteburn during the 15th century, Besporn and Bettbornn (1525), Bedweiler (XVIe siècle), Betboorn and Bethboren (17th century), Bettborn or Bettpert (1779).

History 
Bettborn was a part of the seigneury of Fénétrange-Schwanhals. 

The village was destroyed during the Thirty Years' War.

Population

See also 
 Communes of the Moselle department

References

External links 
 

Communes of Moselle (department)

lb:Bettborn